This is a '''list of state agencies in Nebraska.

Agencies

See also 
 History of Nebraska

References 

 
State agencies
Nebraska